Bierkowice may refer to the following places in Poland:
Bierkowice in Gmina Kłodzko, Kłodzko County in Lower Silesian Voivodeship (SW Poland)
Other places called Bierkowice (listed in Polish Wikipedia)